Avail is an American melodic hardcore band from Richmond, Virginia. Originally from Reston, Virginia, the band formed in 1987, its members including Joe Banks, Doug Crosby, Brien Stewart, and Mikey Warstler. The only original remaining member, guitar player Joe Banks, teamed up with rival band LDK's (Learning Disabled Kids) Tim Barry. They moved to Richmond in 1990, and soon, after numerous line up changes, put together a solid lineup to release their first album Satiate in 1992. Many of their lyrics center on Richmond. The band released six studio albums.

The band has never officially disbanded, but has not released any new material since 2002 and stopped playing live shows in 2007.

On March 26, 2019, the band announced a reunion show at The National in Richmond, Virginia, scheduled for July 19. Since then, they have played multiple shows and continue to tour. There are currently no plans to release any new material.

Members
Current
Tim Barry - vocals
Joe Banks - guitar
Justin "Gwomper" Burdick - bass
Erik Larson - drums
Beau Beau Butler - cheerleader

Former members
Brien Stewart - vocals
Chuck McCauley - bass
Robert Kelshian - bass
DJ Grimes - bass
Doug Crosby - drums
Mikey Warstler - bass
Ed Trask- drums

Label change 
Avail self-released their first LP, Satiate on Catheter-Assembly Records. It was later re-released by Lookout! Records. They released several studio releases on Lookout! and then went on to Fat Wreck Chords for One Wrench and Front Porch Stories.  Most recently, they have signed on with Jade Tree Records who has recently re-released the Avail albums Dixie, 4am Friday, and Over the James.

Legacy in Richmond
Tim Barry is currently writing and performing solo music. Joe Banks, Chuck McCauley and Erik Larson have teamed up in the band Freeman.

Discography

Albums
 Satiate - 1992 - Lookout! Records
 Dixie - 1994 - Lookout! Records
 4am Friday - 1996 - Lookout! Records
 Over the James - 1998 - Lookout! Records
 One Wrench - 2000 - Fat Wreck Chords
 Front Porch Stories - 2002 - Fat Wreck Chords

Live albums
 Live at the Kings Head Inn - 1993 - Old Glory Records
 Live at the Bottom of the Hill in San Francisco - 1998 - Lookout! Records
 V.M. Live Presents...Avail - 1999 - Liberation Records

Demo albums
 Each Other - 1988
 Reaching Out - 1989

EPs
 Who's to Say What Stays the Same - 1991 - Sunspot Records
 Attempt to Regress - 1993 - Catheter Assembly
 The Fall of Richmond - 1997 - Lookout! Records - split EP with (Young) Pioneers
 100 Times - 1999 - Fat Wreck Chords

Music videos
 "Simple Song" (1996)
 "West Wye" (2002)

References

External links

 Full Live Set from The Fest 6
 Scanner Zine interview with Beau
 Welcome to Flavor Country interview with Tim
 Tim Barry's interview on DPR
 Chuck McCauley's page

Musical groups established in 1987
Fat Wreck Chords artists
Jade Tree (record label) artists
Music of Richmond, Virginia
Punk rock groups from Virginia
Musical groups from Virginia